A throttle body spacer is usually a  thick piece of metal that is bolted to the outlet of the throttle body of an automotive engine upstream of air flow into the manifold. By changing the airflow, this after-market add-on claims to be a performance enhancing accessory that can increase an engine's horse power, torque and fuel economy. It functions by swirling or directing the air flow to maximize air volume to the manifold. There is much debate about the veracity of the manufacturers' claims for these devices. The general consensus is that it works well on some engine configurations, and not at all or adversely on others. 

Vehicle modifications
Engine technology
In 2009 the BBK Performance R&D Department performed extensive dyno testing of off the shelf throttle body spacers from other manufacturers. The intention was to determine whether or not throttle body spacers were a viable product that BBK could manufacture that would provide notable results for their customers. The tests were performed on Ford 4.6L 3-V, GM LS, and Mopar HEMI V8 applications using a Dynojet 248C dynamometer. The tests consisted of a baseline dyno run, cool down period, and a repeat test after the spacers were installed. None of the spacers produced any additional horsepower or torque when tested. The only notable change was a loss of 4 horsepower to the tires on the Mopar application with the spacer installed. An additional test was run after removing the spacer, resulting in a return of the lost horsepower. Proving that some spacers can actually rob power from an engine. After seeing the results, it was clear that throttle body spacers were simply gimmicks and provided no real performance value. BBK scrapped all plans to manufacture throttle body spacers.